Pilauco is a paleontological and archaeological site located in the city of Osorno in Southern Chile. 
The site contains both human made lithic artifacts and megafauna remains–including gomphotheres. All the horizons containing megafauna and evidence of human activity date to the late Pleistocene. The calibrated radiocarbon dates indicate there was human activity in the site between 16,400 and -12,800 cal years B.P.

The site is claimed to contain evidence for the Younger Dryas impact hypothesis. This evidence include sediment layers with charcoal and pollen assemblages both indicating major disturbances as well as rare metallic spherules, and a Pt. Au and Pd peak anomaly originating from claimed to be derivative of airbursts or impacts.

Most of the stone artifacts found in Pilauco are made of volcanic rock such as dacite, rhyodacite and rhyolite from the Puyehue-Cordón Caulle Volcanic Complex immediately east in the Andes. Yet these rocks were imported by humans to the site as nearby rivers have not transported it.

Paleontology 
In a 2007-2008 paleontological investigation 648 complete and fractured bones, 37 teeth, 11 coprolites, 348 wood pieces, 126 seeds, 28 skin and hair fragments were found. Further, 71 sediment samples were collected for analysis.

See also
List of archaeological sites in Chile
Monte Verde
Settlement of the Americas

References

Archaeological cultures of South America
Pre-Columbian cultures
Archaeological sites in Chile
Geography of Los Lagos Region
Former populated places in Chile
Pre-Clovis archaeological sites in the Americas
Pleistocene paleontological sites of South America
Paleontology in Chile